The Judo competition at the 1993 Mediterranean Games was held in Perpignan, France on 20 June 1993.

Medal overview

Men

Medal table

References
Results of the 1993 Mediterranean Games (JudoInside.com)

External links
 

1993
Mediterranean Games
Mediterranean Games